Chah-e Dasht Mohammad Khan 6 (also Romanized as Chāh-e Dasht Moḩammad Khān 6; also known as Ānṣārīyeh) is a village in Sahra Rural District, Anabad District, Bardaskan County, Razavi Khorasan Province, Iran. At the 2006 census, its population was 17, in 5 families.

References 

Populated places in Bardaskan County